Mu Cancri (μ Cancri, μ Cnc, Mu Cnc) is the name of several stars

 Mu2 Cancri (10 Cancri)
 Mu1 Cancri (BL Cancri, 9 Cancri)

Mu Cancri also sometimes just means Mu2 Cancri.

Cancri, Mu
Cancer (constellation)